Diana Julianto (born 14 February 1984) is an Indonesian former tennis player.

She made her debut as a professional in November 2000, aged 14, at an ITF tournament in Jakarta. In doubles, she won one tournament, an ITF event at Jakarta in 2003.

Julianto was part of Indonesia's Fed Cup team in 2002.

ITF Circuit finals

Doubles (1–0)

External links
 
 

Indonesian female tennis players
1984 births
Living people
Sportspeople from Bandung
21st-century Indonesian women